General elections were held for the Legislative Council in Nyasaland in August 1961. The result was a victory for the Malawi Congress Party, which won all 20 lower roll seats (in five of which they were unopposed) and two of the eight higher roll seats.

Electoral system
There were two voter rolls, a lower roll with a predominantly African electorate, which elected 20 members, and had 106,095 registered voters, and a higher roll of largely European and Asian electors, which elected eight members, with 4,337 registered voters. As five constituencies in the lower roll were uncontested, only 75,707 voters were eligible on election day. All members were elected from single-member constituencies, which largely followed the same boundaries as the country's districts.

Results

Aftermath
Before the elections, the Colonial Office had assumed that the Malawi Congress Party would be entitled to three Executive Council seats through winning a majority of the lower roll seats. As the Lancaster House agreement provided that two Executive Council seats would go to ministers elected from the higher roll, it was thought that the mainly white United Federal Party would gain both these seats. In the event, the United Federal Party only won five seats, two going to Congress and one to a Congress-inclined independent, Colin Cameron. The Governor offered the United Federal Party a single Executive Council seat, which it refused. This left all five elected Executive Council seats available for Congress candidates.

Sources
The National Archives (United Kingdom): File DO 158/36: "Malawi Congress Party"
The National Archives (United Kingdom): File CO 1015/2444: "Malawi Congress party"
Lucy Mair, The Nyasaland Elections of 1961 (London: Athlone Press, 1962)

References

Nyasaland
1961 in Nyasaland
Elections in Malawi
Nyasaland
August 1961 events in Africa
Election and referendum articles with incomplete results